Pratima Yarlagadda is an American actress, host, model and beauty queen. She won Miss Indiana USA (1999) and was a finalist in Miss USA (1999). She went on to make Miss Universe history placing in the top six at Miss USA, making her the first woman of East Indian descent to place in the top ten. Her accomplishments were featured in various newspapers and in such publications as India Today recognizing her as a forthcoming East Indian presence in the entertainment industry.

After moving to New York City Pratima signed with Ford Models. Her work has been featured in such publications as Vogue Italia, Cosmopolitan, Glamour, and Town & Country among others.

Pratima currently resides in Los Angeles where she is represented by Ford Models and Innovative Artists.

References

External links
Official web site

1981 births
Living people
Miss USA 1999 delegates
Place of birth missing (living people)
Models from New York City
People from Indiana
American people of Indian descent